Jahanabad (also Romanized as Jahānābād; also known as Jānābād, Jonābād, and Jūnabād) is a village in Shaban Rural District, in the Central District of Nahavand County, Hamadan Province, Iran. At the 2006 census, its population was 2,022, in 532 families.

References 

Populated places in Nahavand County